Järvajõe is a village in Tapa Parish, Lääne-Viru County, in northeastern Estonia. It lies on the left bank of the Valgejõgi River.

References

Villages in Lääne-Viru County